Stella Johnson (born July 11, 1998) is an American professional basketball player who most recently played for the Washington Mystics of the Women's National Basketball Association (WNBA). She played college basketball for the Rider Broncs.

Career 
Despite playing on a top-tier Amateur Athletic Union team, Johnson was unranked and not recruited by major college teams. She was recruited by and enrolled in Rider University of the Metro Atlantic Athletic Conference (MAAC), whose women's basketball team had never made the NCAA tournament. In her four seasons with the Rider Broncs, she was named MAAC Player of the Year two times and led the team to its first postseason appearance in the 2017 Women's National Invitation Tournament. At the end of the 2019–20 season, she was the only active Division I player to record 2,000 points, 700 rebounds, 400 assists and 300 steals.

She was drafted in the 3rd round of the 2020 WNBA draft by the Phoenix Mercury, with the 29th overall pick. She was waived by the Mercury before the start of the season, but was signed by the Chicago Sky on June 29, 2020. On July 28, she made her WNBA debut in a win over the Los Angeles Sparks. On August 12, she was waived by the Sky. On August 13, the Washington Mystics signed Johnson after they were issued an emergency hardship waiver.

Rider statistics
Source

WNBA career statistics

Regular season

|-
| align="left" | 2020
| align="left" | Chicago
| 4 || 0 || 1.5 || .000 || .000 || .000 || 0.5 || 0.0 || 0.3 || 0.0 || 0.0 || 0.0
|-
| align="left" | 2020
| align="left" | Washington
| 5 || 2 || 18.8 || .485 || .643 || 1.000 || 2.0 || 2.4 || 1.0 || 0.4 || 0.8 || 9.2
|-
| align="left" | 2021
| align="left" | Washington
| 6 || 0 || 5.2 || .375 || .400 || 1.000 || 0.5 || 0.3 || 0.0 || 0.2 || 0.8 || 2.0
|-
| align="left" | Career
| align="left" | 2 years, 2 teams
| 15 || 2 || 8.7 || .452 || .579 || 1.000 || 1.0 || 0.9 || 0.4 || 0.2 || 0.6 || 3.9

References

External links 
 Career information and player statistics from WNBA.com and Basketball-Reference.com

1998 births
Living people
American women's basketball players
Basketball players from New Jersey
Chicago Sky players
People from Denville, New Jersey
Phoenix Mercury draft picks
Point guards
Rider Broncs women's basketball players
Washington Mystics players